Nicolas Rio  (born 1995) is a French orienteering competitor. He was born in Vénissieux, and resides in Lyon. 

He won a bronze medal in the relay at the 2018 World Orienteering Championships in Latvia, together with Lucas Basset and Frederic Tranchand. He also competed in the 2016 and 2017 World Orienteering Championships.

References

External links

French orienteers
Male orienteers
Foot orienteers
1995 births
Living people
People from Vénissieux
Sportspeople from Lyon Metropolis